Helen Webb Harris founded the Wake-Robin Golf Club in 1937; it is the United States's oldest registered African-American women's golf club. The first meeting of the club was held at her house with thirteen women attending. The club was named after the Wake-Robin wildflower.

Harris was the club's first president, and under her leadership the club joined the United Golf Association and the Eastern Golf Association. In 1938 the club drafted and sent a petition to Secretary of the Interior Harold L. Ickes seeking to desegregate the public courses of the District of Columbia. In response Ickes approved the construction of a nine-hole golf course on the site of an abandoned trash dump, called Langston Golf Course, which opened in 1939.

The Wake-Robin Golf Club and the Royal Golf Club continued to pressure Secretary Ickes, and he issued an order in 1941 opening public courses to all.  In 1947 Harris was elected as the first female president of the Eastern Golf Association; she was president for two terms. The Wake-Robin Golf Club was part of the movement to force the Professional Golfers Association to drop its "White-only" rule for eligibility, which it did in 1961.

In 1973 Harris was inducted into the National Afro‐American Golfers Hall of Fame.

Harris was also an educator in the Washington, DC school system. The Helen Webb Harris Scholarship Fund was established in 2007.

Some of the Wake-Robin Golf Club's records are held at Howard University.

References

African-American people
American civil rights activists
Women civil rights activists